Óscar Mauricio Álvarez Paniagua (born December 9, 1977 in Antioquia) is a Colombian former professional road cyclist.

Major results

2002
 2nd  Road race, Central American and Caribbean Games
2003
 1st Stage 1 Vuelta al Tolima
 1st Stage 10 Vuelta a Colombia
 2nd Overall Vuelta a las Americas
2004
 1st Overall Clásica Nacional Marco Fidel Suárez
 3rd Overall Vuelta a El Salvador
1st Stages 1 & 2
2006
 1st Stage 7 Vuelta a Chiriquí
2009
 1st  Road race, National Road Championships
 1st Stage 4 Clásica Ciudad de Girardot
 5th Overall Vuelta a los Santanderes
2011
 1st Stage 2a (TTT) Vuelta a Colombia
2014
 1st Stage 1b Vuelta a Guatemala

External links
 

1977 births
Living people
Colombian male cyclists
Vuelta a Colombia stage winners
Sportspeople from Antioquia Department
Central American and Caribbean Games silver medalists for Colombia
Competitors at the 2002 Central American and Caribbean Games
Central American and Caribbean Games medalists in cycling
20th-century Colombian people
21st-century Colombian people